Santol, officially the Municipality of Santol, is a 4th class municipality in the province of La Union, Philippines. According to the 2020 census, it has a population of 14,166 people.

Santol is situated in the north-eastern part of the Province of La Union. It is bounded on the north by the Municipality of Sudipen, on the north-east by the upland Municipality of Sugpon in Ilocos Sur, on the south by the Municipality of San Gabriel, and on the west by the Municipality of Balaoan.

Geography

Barangays
Santol is politically subdivided into barangays. These barangays are headed by elected officials: Barangay Captain, Barangay Council, whose members are called Barangay Councilors. All are elected every three years.

Climate

Demographics

Economy

Government
Santol, belonging to the first congressional district of the province of La Union, is governed by a mayor designated as its local chief executive and by a municipal council as its legislative body in accordance with the Local Government Code. The mayor, vice mayor, and the councilors are elected directly by the people through an election which is being held every three years.

Elected officials

Gallery

References

External links

 [ Philippine Standard Geographic Code]
 Philippine Census Information
 Local Governance Performance Management System

Municipalities of La Union